The Deerskins (French Les Deerskin) is a Canadian Aboriginal-oriented cartoon show produced by JerryCo Communications And 9 Story Entertainment.  It has aired on APTN and Teletoon since 2013, presently on 10:00pm Thursday nights in 2017.

Created and produced by Jerry Thevenet, the founder of JerryCo, The Deerskins relates the story of the title aboriginal family who have been forced to leave their reserve and now live in the town of Cheddarville, where the majority of the white people who live there have strange beliefs regarding Native peoples. They try to fit into this strange world, though they know it is a tough way of life. The show is produced in three languages: French, English, and Mohawk.

The show
Unlike other cartoons of the time, the show is produced by the small crew of the JerryCo studios in Montreal  entirely on ToonBoom Harmony software. Jerry Thevenet performs a majority of the work, such as screenplay, illustrating, and editing; with the assistance of Éric Héroux, Christopher Goodkey, Rick Thomas, Zee Risek, Paul Trineer, Denis Doucet and editor Marc Poirier.  Also, despite having approximately 50 characters, there's only two voice actors: Paula Davis (for the female voices) and Shawn Youngchief (for the male voices). The score and title song were written by Paul Baraka.

Characters

Deerskins
Thunder, the dad, star of the Tomahawk Pete show
Dawna, the mom, a surgeon
Summer (voice actress does Raven in Wapos Bay), older daughter, model, played Pink Feather in episode 20 of her dad's show which took 126 takes, aka Mizz Wawkee-Tawkee (also Mizz Beautifullest)
Phoenix, younger brother, genius who gets rich inventing things

Illuminati
Hold shares in cigarettes:
George W. Bush
Governator
Sylvester Stallone
Stephen Hawking

Jerry McGwerstein: talent agent for Smuck Pictures and Summer's agent
Miss Finklestein, runs Miss Fink's Beauty School

Models
Kiya is a Saudi billionaire
Ana Rexya Nervosky (aka Mizz Chernobyl)
Peaches Dixie (aka Mizz Hicksville) a fan of the Ku Klux Klan
Sum Yung Guy (aka Mizz Bangkok)
Mizz Co-Ed
Mizz Ethiopia, a fan of Anthony Hopkins
Mia Airee (aka Mizz Aba_daba_do)

Other characters
Bradley Pooper 
Thunder's unnamed blonde, teen, pot-smoking co-star
Mel Horowitz the baker
Mayor Poutine

Episodes

Season 1
 Meet the Deerskins
 Welcome to Cheddarville
 Roomies and Loonies
 I Hate You Mel Horowitz
 Meet the Mushburgers
 This is the Police!
 A Funny Thing Happened
 Are We There Yet?
 Tunnel of Love
 Radio Head
 Anonymous
 Invasion of the Body Smashers
 The Men in Beige

Season 2
 Pow Yeow!
 The Walking Dread
 Bingo Burka
 Crystal Balls
 Up in Smoke: Thunder gets high with an 18 year old blonde girl in a pink dress
 One Man's Junk
 Mizz Beautifullest
 To Be or Not to Be
 Someone stole my Thunder
 Cheezefest
 Phoney Baloney
 Crème Brûlée
 Orca Windtree

The Stand-up segment
At the very end of most episodes, Thunder Deerskin does a stand-up act in front of an audience, during the roll of the credits. The audience applauds or boos him depending on his delivery.

Cast & crew
 Voices: Paula Davis and Shawn Youngchief
 Produced, Directed, Written and Illustrated by Jerry Thevenet
 Backgrounds: Denis Doucet and Christopher Goodkey
 Score by Paul Baraka
 Editors: Jerry Thevenet and Marc Poirier

Production
A JerryCo production, The show is produced with the financial participation of the Canada Media Fund, Gouvernement du Québec ; the Film and Television Tax Credit; Gestion SODEC and the Government of Canada; the Canadian Film and Video Production Tax Credit; and in association with the Aboriginal Peoples Television Network (CEO Jean LaRose; eastern Programming Head Jean-François O'Bomsawin).

References

External links
 Show information on APTN
 The behind-the-scenes look of the series

2010s Canadian adult animated television series
2013 Canadian television series debuts
Canadian adult animated comedy television series
English-language television shows
Aboriginal Peoples Television Network original programming
Animated television series about dysfunctional families
First Nations television series